The UK Video Charts named the top-selling DVDs in the United Kingdom for each week in 2001. Dinosaur held the top spot for the most with six consecutive weeks in March/April. Shrek and Bridget Jones's Diary each figured as top sellers for four weeks to round off the year.

Chart history

External links
British Video Association
Top 40 Videos Chart at The Official Charts Company
Archive of number-ones at The Official Charts Company
The Official Charts Company (OCC)

2001 record charts
2001 in British cinema